Florence Arnold was an American hard-edge abstract painter from North Orange County, California. She had become active in Fullerton's art community by establishing organizations and showcases to promote interest of art in youth. She has had works installed in California and internationally.

Background 
Florence (“Flossie”) Maud Arnold (née Millner) was born on September 6, 1900, in Prescott, Arizona Territory. She earned a Bachelor of Art in music in 1926 at Mills College in Oakland, CA and a Bachelor’s in education in 1939 at the University of Southern California in Los Angeles, CA. She subsequently earned a music teaching credential in 1937 from Claremont College. After getting married, she had settled in Fullerton, California. She taught at Fullerton Union High School. Arnold taught music for 42 years.

She has had her work exhibited at the Muckenthaler Cultural Center in Fullerton, Laguna Art Museum, and the Smithsonian. She was an artist in residence at Fullerton College Art Department’s art gallery in 1973. She had art displayed in places outside the United States in Madrid, Copenhagen, Florence, Rome, Milan, and Venice.

Art career 
When she retired from music around 50 years old, she began to take painting classes at Fullerton College. She initially painted landscapes and still life, but became drawn to abstract style art. She drew inspiration from John McLaughlin’s work in abstract art.

She became very active in the art community around North Orange County. It was then she would be called Flossie by her friends. She organized the Orange County Art Association. In 1966, she was one of the founders for Night in Fullerton. Another organization she helped found was the Art Alliance at California State University, Fullerton. She was a founding member of the Muckenthaler Cultural Center  She founded events to promote young artists in pursuing their art careers with one reoccurring event being the Florence Young Artist Festival/Exhibition. She started the festival in 1976. This events also celebrated accomplished youth artist selected to be part of the exhibition. The Muckenthaler Cultural Center has last hosted this event in 2016.

Her art is classified as hard edge style abstraction. This phrase was coined by art critic Jules Langser in 1959 and Arnold became part of the Hard-edge painting school of art.<Fullerton: the Boom Years, pg 83> She studied and developed her technique under Karl Benjamin.

Later life 
She died at 93 years old in 1994. Arnold had donated some of her art to Fullerton College which remains in the art department’s permanent collection. The California State University, Fullerton Art Alliance organization continues to grant scholarships in Arnold’s name at for art students specializing in drawing, illustration, printing, or painting. This scholarship was established to honor her in 1990.

References

Sources 
 Mudrick, Sylvia Palmer; Richey, Debora, and Cathy Thomas. (2015) Fullerton: the Boom Years. The History Press. 
 http://themuck.org/programing/2016/11/3/florence-arnold-young-artist-exhibition
 http://lagunaartmuseum.org/florence-arnold/
 http://libraryfchistory.fullcoll.edu/photos.php?image_id=1705
 Pickel, Mary Lou (March 5, 1994). "Artist F.M. Arnold Dies at 93; Helped Launch 'A Night in Fullerton'." LA Times. Archived.http://articles.latimes.com/1994-03-05/local/me-30186_1_artist-f-m-arnold
 Angel, Sherry (September 14, 1990). "Fullerton Artist Says There's an Art to Living." LA Times. Archived. http://articles.latimes.com/1990-09-14/news/vw-400_1_fullerton-arboretum
 Flocken, Corinne(March 18, 1989). "Showing Off : Works of 500 Fullerton Students Move From Refrigerator Door to Muckenthaler." LA Times. Archived. http://articles.latimes.com/1989-03-18/entertainment/ca-333_1_fullerton-students

Related Resources 

 Who Was Who in American Art 1564-1975 (1999). Sound View Press. 
 La Tour, Jesse (February 15, 2012). "The Life of 'Flossie'." Blog. http://jesselatour.blogspot.com/2012/02/life-of-flossie.html
 https://www.chaffeymuseum.org/content/artists/Arnold_Florence
 http://www.theartstory.org/movement-hard-edge-painting.htm
 http://www.fullerton.edu/arts/students/scholarships.php
 La Tour, Jesse (2015). "Alumni Stories: Florence Millner Arnold." Fullerton College Centennial. http://fullertoncollegecentennial.com/alumni-stories/florence-arnold.html
 https://www.fullerton.edu/arts/alumni_and_friends/art-alliance/index.php
 http://art.fullcoll.edu/event_permanentcollection.php
 http://artmuseum.mills.edu:5000/Obj1214?sid=26652&x=317330
 http://artmuseum.mills.edu:5000/Obj1215?sid=26652&x=317332
 http://artmuseum.mills.edu:5000/Obj1216?sid=26652&x=317334
 Curtis, Cathy (August 19, 1991). "Secret of Irvine Center Exhibit Is That the Works Are Ageless : 'Greater Years, Greater Visions' spotlights work done at advanced age by ceramist Beatrice Wood and painters Helen Lundeberg and Florence Arnold." LA Times. Archived. http://articles.latimes.com/1991-08-19/entertainment/ca-579_1_irvine-fine-arts-center

American music educators
1900 births
1994 deaths
People from Fullerton, California
Mills College alumni
University of Southern California alumni
Fullerton College alumni
American women painters
American abstract artists
Abstract painters
20th-century American women artists
Schoolteachers from California
Painters from California
20th-century American educators
Women music educators
20th-century American women educators